Alicia Anne Garrido Limtiaco (born August 7, 1963) is a former United States Attorney for the Districts of Guam and the Northern Mariana Islands. She was sworn in on June 21, 2010, and served until March 10, 2017. She was previously Attorney General of Guam, serving from January 3, 2007, to June 21, 2010. Limtiaco also ran as a candidate for Lieutenant Governor of Guam in the 2018 gubernatorial election as the running mate of senator Frank Aguon Jr, in the Democratic gubernatorial primaries.

Early life
Alicia Anne Garrido Limtiaco was born August 7, 1963. She attended University of Southern California where she earned a BBA and UCLA School of Law where she earned a juris doctor. She and her husband Vincent have one daughter. While in law school, she was a judicial extern for the United States District Court for the Central District of California. She then worked as a partner in various law firms, as an assistant attorney general in the Attorney General's Office and as an adjunct faculty member at University of Guam and Guam Community College.

Election

2006 Election
In a three-way race, Limtiaco received 15,163 votes (43%) second winner is future Guam judge Vernon P.G. Perez (11,559), and was defeated incumbent AG Douglas Moylan (8,118) in the 2006 primary election. In November election, Limtiaco won this race received 21,628 votes (57%) defeating by Vernon Perez (14,444) in the 2006 general election.

While Attorney General, she joined 22 Democrats and 1 Republican in supporting the creation of the Consumer Financial Protection Bureau.

U.S. Attorney
In 2010, Delegate Madeleine Bordallo recommended Limtiaco to President Barack Obama for the position of U.S Attorney. She was sworn in on June 21, 2010. She recommended that her deputy Phil Tydingco succeed her as Guam AG, but Governor Felix Perez Camacho appointed John Weisenberger. She replaced George W. Bush appointee Leonardo Rapadas who had served since 2003.

See also
 2017 dismissal of U.S. attorneys

References

|-

1963 births
21st-century American politicians
21st-century American women politicians
Attorneys General of Guam
Chamorro people
Guamanian Democrats
Guamanian women in politics
Living people
Marshall School of Business alumni
United States Attorneys
UCLA School of Law alumni